A by-election was held for the New South Wales Legislative Assembly electorate of Maitland on 21 February 1981 following the resignation of Milton Morris to unsuccessfully contest the federal seat of Lyne at the 1980 election.

By-elections for the seats of Cessnock, Oxley and Sturt were held on the same day.

Dates

Result

	

Milton Morris resigned to unsuccessfully contest the seat of contested the federal seat of Lyne.

Aftermath
Peter Toms' career was to be short-lived, as he was defeated by Allan Walsh in the Labor "Wranslide" at the election in September 1981.

See also
Electoral results for the district of Maitland
List of New South Wales state by-elections

References

1981 elections in Australia
New South Wales state by-elections
1980s in New South Wales